Martina Hingis and Jana Novotná defeated the defending champion Natasha Zvereva and her partner Lindsay Davenport in the final, 6–1, 7–6(7–4) to win the women's doubles tennis title at the 1998 French Open. It was the second step in an eventual Grand Slam for Hingis.

Gigi Fernández and Zvereva were the reigning champions, but Fernández retired from tennis at the end of 1997.

Seeds
Champion seeds are indicated in bold text while text in italics indicates the round in which those seeds were eliminated.

Draw

Finals

Top half

Section 1

Section 2

Bottom half

Section 3

Section 4

External links
1998 French Open – Women's draws and results at the International Tennis Federation

Women's Doubles
French Open by year – Women's doubles
1998 in women's tennis
1998 in French women's sport